Sead Župić (born 18 May 1994) is a Serbian football midfielder who plays for Jošanica. He is a son of Bajro Župić.

References

External links
 
 Sead Župić stats at utakmica.rs

1994 births
Living people
Sportspeople from Novi Pazar
Association football midfielders
Serbian footballers
FK Novi Pazar players
Serbian SuperLiga players